Epomis is a genus of ground beetles (Carabidae). The larvae of this genus are notable for being obligate role-reversal predators. Amphibians such as frogs are normally predators of beetles; however, Epomis larvae feed exclusively on amphibians.

Description
Epomis beetles are often metallic blue- or green-colored, with a striking yellow-orange rim on the elytra and mostly yellow-colored legs and antennae. They can be distinguished from the closely related genus Chlaenius by the short (less than three times as long as wide) and triangular labial palps.

Like many ground beetle larvae, they are elongated with two extensions (urogomphi) at the rear end. They have characteristic double-hooked mandibles. Larvae of the two European species can be distinguished by their color patterns.

Feeding behavior
Epomis larvae hunt in a rare reversal of the usual predator-prey relationship between amphibians and insects. They lure their amphibian predators by making prey-like movements, then evade the predator's attack and disable the predator, often with a bite to the throat or underside. After the attack, the larva stays attached to the amphibian while feeding on it, similarly to external parasites. Adult Epomis beetles are generalist predators but can also feed on amphibians. They sneak up behind their victims, and hold on firmly using their legs. To paralyze the victim, the beetle makes an incision in the pelvic region with its mandibles. The incision apparently cuts leg muscles. The amphibian loses its ability to move and is eaten by the beetle. Scientists speculate that Epomis evolved this behavior as an aggressive evasion tactic in response to predation by amphibians and the success of this tactic led to Epomis becoming an obligate predator, itself.

Taxonomic status
The genus Epomis belongs to tribe Chlaeniini in the subfamily Licininae, which consists of species associated with swamps, temporary ponds, and similar types of wetland habitats. It contains about 30 species distributed in the Old World only, with the majority of species occurring in the Afrotropical region. Many taxonomists consider Epomis as a subgenus of Chlaenius, but differences in larval and adult morphology, as well as the unique life history of Epomis beetles, support their separate standing as a genus.

List of species
 Epomis alluaudi Fairmaire, 1901
 Epomis amarae Andrewes, 1920
 Epomis barkeri Csiki, 1931
 Epomis bocandei (Laferte-Senectere, 1852)
 Epomis circumscriptus Duftschmid, 1812
 Epomis croesus (Fabricius, 1801)
 Epomis croyi Kirschenhofer, 2003
 Epomis daressalaami Jedlicka, 1957
 Epomis dejeani Dejean, 1831
 Epomis deplanatus (Laferte-Senectere, 1851)
 Epomis duvaucelii (Dejean, 1831)
 Epomis elisabethanus Burgeon, 1935
 Epomis elongatus (Klug, 1833)
 Epomis fimbriatus (Klug, 1833)
 Epomis immunitus Murray, 1858
 Epomis jordani (Basilewsky, 1955)
 Epomis kenyerii Kirschenhofer, 2003
 Epomis lastii Bates, 1886
 Epomis latreillei (Laferte-Senectere, 1852)
 Epomis louwerensi Andrewes, 1936
 Epomis loveridgei (Basilewsky, 1951)
 Epomis nigricans Wiedemann, 1821
 Epomis nossibianus Facchini, 2011
 Epomis pharaonis Motschulsky, 1865
 Epomis protensus Chaudoir, 1876
 Epomis rhodesianus Peringuey, 1899
 Epomis simba Alluaud, 1929
 Epomis tschitscherini Jedlicka, 1952
 Epomis vientianensis Kirschenhofer, 2009
 Epomis violaceipennis Chaudoir, 1876

References

External links

 Epomis Bonelli, 1810, Carabidae of the World

Licininae
Articles containing video clips